Jörg Reeb (born 6 January 1972 in Saarbrücken) is a German footballer who is currently playing for ASC Dudweiler.

Honours 
 Bundesliga runner-up: 1998–99, 1999–2000

References

1972 births
Living people
German footballers
1. FC Saarbrücken players
Arminia Bielefeld players
Bayer 04 Leverkusen players
1. FC Köln players
FC Augsburg players
Bundesliga players
2. Bundesliga players
Association football defenders
Association football midfielders
Sportspeople from Saarbrücken